Mariya Sergeyevna Shorets (Russian Мария Сергеевна Шорец, born 9 August 1990, in Saint Petersburg) is a Russian professional triathlete, Russian U23 Champion of the year 2011, bronze medalist in the Elite ranking, and a member of the National Team.

On 30 December 2010, the title Master of Sports (International Class) was conferred upon two Saint Petersburg based triathletes, Shorets and Olga Dmitrieva.

In 2010, Shorets represented the club Triathlon SC Riederau in the German circuit Bundesliga.

In 2011, Shorets is also a member of the French elite club TOCC (Triathlon Olympique Club Cessonais), like many other foreign guest stars (e.g. Zsófia Kovács, Zsófia Tóth, Aileen Morrison and Non Stanford) and could take part in the prestigious French Club Championship Series Lyonnaise des Eaux. At the two first triathlons of the 2011 circuit, however, Shorets was not among the five triathletes nominated by TOCC.

Like Natalia Shliakhtenko, Mariya Shorets lives in Saint Petersburg, attends a High Performance Sports School for future Olympians (Государственное образовательное учреждение среднего профессионального образования "Санкт-Петербургское училище олимпийского резерва № 1", г. Санкт-Петербург) and represents the club or rather nationwide sports association Dynamo (Динамо).

ITU Competitions 
In the five years from 2006 to 2010, Shorets took part in 13 ITU competitions and achieved 9 top ten positions.
The following list is based upon the official ITU rankings and the ITU Athletes's Profile Page.
Unless indicated otherwise, the following events are triathlons (Olympic Distance) and refer to the Elite category.

DNF = did not finish · DNS = did not start

External links 
 Russian Triathlon Federation in Russian
 Shorets' Club Dynamo in Russian

Notes 

Russian female triathletes
1990 births
Living people
Sportspeople from Saint Petersburg
Triathletes at the 2016 Summer Olympics
Olympic triathletes of Russia